Starting All Over Again may refer to:

 "Starting All Over Again" (Mel & Tim song)
 "Starting All Over Again" (One Horse Blue song)

See also
 Starting Over Again (disambiguation)